Luxury Card is a privately held financial services company owned by Black Card LLC. It provides credit cards and card loyalties to clients through its Mastercard Titanium Card, Mastercard Black Card, and Mastercard Gold Card issued by Barclays. It also publishes Luxury Magazine, a members only digital and print publication. Cards are issued in the United States as well as Japan and China.

History
Luxury Card was founded as Black Card LLC and launched its first card in 2008. Known as the "Black Card," it was issued as a high-end credit card to provide rewards to consumers with great credit. 

Luxury Card successfully registered "Black Card" as a U.S. trademark in 2009. American Express later sued as the name was similar to its Centurion Card, which it contended was widely known as "the Black Card." The U.S. District Court for the Southern District of New York ruling that Black Card, LLC's trademark of the name "Black Card" should be canceled on grounds that it was merely descriptive. As of 2019, it uses the registered trademark under license.

In 2014, Black Card LLC rebranded as Luxury Card. In 2016, Luxury Card changed its Black Card from Visa to Mastercard. It also added the Titanium Card and Gold Card to its offerings. Cards were also issued internationally beginning in Japan in 2017 and in mainland China in 2018.

Products and services

Luxury Card provides three different credit cards labeled as Black Card, Titanium Card, and Gold Card. All three cards are made of carbon and stainless steel and the Gold Card is made with 24-karat gold. The Titanium Card is the most affordable of Luxury Card's offerings. The Black Card, is a rewards credit card that is the middle-tier offering from Luxury Card.  The Gold Card is considered the higher end of the three cards. 

Benefits for each card vary and can include a 24/7 concierge service, gifts, and worldwide acceptance. Other benefits can include cash-back bonuses, airport lounge access, travel insurance for luggage, trip interruption/cancellation, rental car damages, ID theft protection, and fraud liability protection. It also has a mobile app for users to access benefits and services.

Luxury Card also publishes a bi-annual Luxury Magazine for members-only which is in print and digital form. The magazine covers topics such as travel, design, technology, and fashion.

References

External links
Luxury Card official website
BlackCard.com
LuxuryMagazine.com

Credit cards
Lifestyle magazines published in the United States
English-language magazines
Quarterly magazines published in the United States